Kojima Productions Co., Ltd. is a Japanese video game development studio originally founded in 2005 by video game designer Hideo Kojima, creator of the Metal Gear series. It is the spiritual successor to a production team inside Konami also known as Kojima Productions. The team had around 100 employees, but grew to over 200 for Metal Gear Solid 4: Guns of the Patriots. After leaving Konami, Kojima founded an independent studio with a slightly altered Japanese name in Shinagawa.

History

Formation 

The production team was formed in April 2005, after Konami merged several subsidiaries including Kojima's group at Konami Computer Entertainment Japan. Kojima said the merger relieved him of business management and administrative burdens he had as KCEJ's vice president, and that as head of Kojima Productions he could focus on creating games. According to Kojima, while he now held a position on the Konami board, he still had to persuade staff to invest in his game ideas.

The name of the team follows Konami's "<> production(s)" naming style used between 2004 and 2015.

Closure 
On March 16, 2015, Konami announced that it had restructured the game development operations to change the production structure to a headquarters-controlled system, in order to establish a steadfast operating base capable of responding to the rapid market changes that surround our digital entertainment business". A few days later, an anonymous Konami employee stated that Kojima and the studio's senior staff had planned to leave Konami in December 2015 following the conclusion of their contracts and the release of The Phantom Pain. Konami denied that Kojima was leaving the company and stated that he would still be involved with the company and the Metal Gear franchise. Kojima affirmed that he was still "100% involved" in The Phantom Pain and was determined to make it the greatest game he could. In December 2015, the production team was nominated for Developer of the Year at The Game Awards 2015, but lost to CD Projekt Red. Kojima was reportedly blocked from attending the event by Konami's lawyers, requiring Big Boss's actor Kiefer Sutherland to accept the awards for The Phantom Pain on his behalf.

Independent reformation 
On December 16, 2015, in a joint announcement with Sony Computer Entertainment, Kojima announced that he would start an independent studio, alongside Yoji Shinkawa and Kenichiro Imaizumi. The studio announced that it would develop a new franchise for PlayStation 4. Kojima stated that he "will be taking on a new challenge by establishing my own independent studio, and I am thrilled to be able to embark on this journey with PlayStation, who I have continued to work with all these past years". At E3 2016, Kojima unveiled a trailer to Death Stranding during Sony's pre-E3 conference. It was released by Sony Interactive Entertainment in 2019, and a PC version was released by 505 Games on Windows in July 2020. In November 2019, the studio announced their plans to make films.

Kojima modeled the philosophy of Media Molecule when reforming the studio. After visiting the company in 2016, he simultaneously modeled his own, wanting "a small, intimate type of studio". Kojima praised their high number of female employees and relaxed atmosphere, which he compared to that of a family. He set a limit of one hundred employees for the studio, similar to Media Molecule.

Imaizumi left the company in 2019. In April 2020, the office was temporarily closed after an employee contracted COVID-19.

In October 2020, it was confirmed the company is working on the next game in development.

In November 2021, it was announced that it would open a new business division for films and television series in Los Angeles.

On June 12, 2022, during Microsoft's digital presentation, Kojima announced that it had partnered with Xbox Game Studios to develop a new game featuring a "never before-seen concept" and leveraging Microsoft's "cutting-edge cloud technology".

In December 2022, it was announced that Kojima Productions will produce a film based on Death Stranding with Hammerstone Studios.

Games 

Though Kojima had been working on games at Konami, the production team was not officially formed until 2005. However, Konami retroactively referred to his past games as belonging to the studio. His games for Konami were released until 2015.

Pre-KCEJ/Kojima Productions

Konami Computer Entertainment Japan (KCEJ)

Kojima Productions (Konami production team)

Kojima Productions (independent studio)

Filmography

Notes

References

External links 
  
 Kojima Productions in Japanese Wikipedia (Konami development team)
 Kojima Productions Co., Ltd. in Japanese Wikipedia

Amusement companies of Japan
Privately held companies of Japan
Re-established companies
Software companies based in Tokyo
Video game companies established in 2005
Video game companies established in 2015
Video game companies of Japan
Video game development companies
Japanese companies established in 2005
Japanese companies established in 2015
Konami
Hideo Kojima